Skagerrak is the name of a 1,700 MW high-voltage direct current (HVDC) transmission facility between Tjele (Denmark) and Kristiansand (Norway).  It is owned and operated by Statnett in Norway, and Energinet in Denmark. The lines connect the hydroelectric-based Norwegian grid and the wind and thermal power-based Danish grid. In operation it enables more renewable energy in the energy mix, and more efficient use of electricity.

Technical features
The  Skagerrak 1–3 scheme consists of a  overhead line and a  underwater cable.  It has a capacity of 1,050 megawatts (MW).  Both land parts in Denmark and in Norway uses overhead lines from the cable landing point to the converter stations. The overhead lines in Denmark are set to be renovated in 2016 for increased lifespan. The towers were originally constructed for four poles, but were rebuilt for three conductors (three poles) when Skagerrak 3 was established. Near Aggersund HVDC Skagerrak crossed Aggersund strait overhead on  towers with a  span, but were later converted to underground cables. The pylons of this span were the tallest electricity pylons of an HVDC line in Europe.

For such a long submarine cable, an AC transmission scheme would not be feasible since too much of the cable's capacity would be consumed by the capacitance of the cable itself, and the power systems in Norway and Jutland are not synchronous.

The transmission has a loss rate of 4%.

The waste heat of the transformers is enough to supply district heating economically for 1,000 homes in nearby towns, but taxes prevent that project. The adjacent Apple Datacenter (supplied in part by the Skagerrak cables via Tjele) was expected to work around the tax issue when supplying district heat to Viborg.

Skagerrak 1 and 2
Skagerrak went in service in 1977 as a bipolar HVDC scheme. This facility  was built with thyristor valves. When installed this underwater cable was the world's longest and deepest underwater HVDC power cable.

Both cables have a capacity of 250 MW at 250 kV.

Skagerrak 3
In 1993 the scheme was extended by HVDC Skagerrak 3. Skagerrak 3 is a monopolar line for a voltage of 350 kV with a capacity of 440 MW at 350 kV.  In installing Skagerrak 3, the old poles Skagerrak 1 and Skagerrak 2 were converted to monopolar HVDC schemes, which run with opposite polarity to Skagerrak 3. In 1999, the full 1,000 MW capacity was reserved by large power companies.

Skagerrak 4
In November 2009, Statnett and Energinet.dk signed the agreement to construct Skagerrak 4. The capacity of Skagerrak 4 is approximately 700 MW. It had been in a test phase since 1 October 2014 and became operational at the end of 2014, when strong winds created negative prices despite the new connection. It was officially inaugurated by Frederik, Crown Prince of Denmark and Haakon, Crown Prince of Norway on 12 March 2015. As for the existing Skagerrak 1-3, the grid connection points are Kristiansand and Tjele. Differently from Skagerrak 1–3, for Skagerrak 4 a cable solution is chosen for the complete route length. Converter stations were built by ABB, as for Skagerrak 1–3. The combined budget is 2.8-3.2 billion DKK.

The technology used was VSC, capable of black start.  Although thyristor-based converters have a loss of only 0.7%, the IGBTs of VSC get close with a loss of 0.8 to 1%. Skagerrak 1 and 2 previously used Skagerrak 3 as a return cable, but 1 and 2 were again coupled so that Skagerrak 4 can use number 3 for returns. The cable also supplies 110 MW of reserve power. Some of the 24 fiber pairs may be rented for business by telecommunications companies.

Sites

Waypoints 

Overhead line in Denmark
 
 
 
 
 
 
 
 
 
 
 
 
 
 
 
 
 
 
 
 
 
 
 
 
 
 
 

 Underground cable in Denmark
 
 
 
 
 

 Overhead line in Norway
 
 
 
 
 
 
 
 
 
 
 
 
 
 
 
 
 
 
 
 
 
 
 
 
 
 

 Electrode line in Norway

See also
 Baltic Cable
 Kontek
 Konti-Skan
 NORD.LINK
 NorNed
 Scotland-Norway interconnector

References

External links

 Description of Skagerrak 3
 Pictures
 More pictures
 Animation of Skagerrak 4
 4c pages for 1+2, 3, 4
 Monthly exchange

Electrical interconnectors to and from the Nordic grid
Electrical interconnectors to and from the Synchronous Grid of Continental Europe
Electric power infrastructure in Denmark
Electric power infrastructure in Norway
HVDC transmission lines
Electrical interconnectors in the North Sea
Denmark–Norway relations
Energy infrastructure completed in 1977
Energy infrastructure completed in 1993
1977 establishments in Denmark
1977 establishments in Norway